Maksim Aleksandrovich Bordachyov (born 18 May 1986) is a Belarusian football defender who currently plays for BATE Borisov.

Career

Club
On 10 August 2013, Bordachyov moved to Tom Tomsk on loan till the end of 2014, with the option to make the move permanent. In January 2014, Tomsk made Bordachyov's move permanent, signing him to a 3.5-year contract.

Bordachyov joined Rostov on a season-long loan deal from Tom Tomsk on 31 July 2014.

International
Bordachyov made his international debut for Belarus on 1 April 2009, in a game against Kazakhstan in a World Cup qualifier. He scored for the national team twice – against Kazakhstan in October 2009 and against Saudi Arabia in November 2009.

Honours
MTZ-RIPO Minsk
Belarusian Cup winner: 2007–08

BATE Borisov
Belarusian Premier League champion: 2009, 2010, 2011, 2012, 2013
Belarusian Cup winner: 2009–10
Belarusian Super Cup winner: 2011, 2013, 2022

Shakhtyor Soligorsk
Belarusian Cup winner: 2018–19

Career statistics

International goals

References

External links
 
 
 

1986 births
Living people
People from Kobryn District
Sportspeople from Brest Region
Belarusian footballers
Association football defenders
Belarus international footballers
Belarusian expatriate footballers
Expatriate footballers in Russia
Russian Premier League players
FC Neman Grodno players
FC Partizan Minsk players
FC BATE Borisov players
FC Tom Tomsk players
FC Rostov players
FC Orenburg players
FC Shakhtyor Soligorsk players
FC Torpedo-BelAZ Zhodino players